Euphaedra dubreka, the Guinea Themis forester, is a butterfly in the family Nymphalidae. It is found in south-eastern Guinea and western Sierra Leone. The habitat consists of forests.

References

Butterflies described in 2005
dubreka